The picturesque dragonet (Synchiropus picturatus) is a brightly colored member of the dragonet family native to the Indo-West Pacific: Philippines, eastern Indonesia and northwest Australia. It occasionally makes its way into the aquarium trade, where it is commonly known as the spotted mandarin, psychedelic mandarin or target mandarin.

Description 
The picturesque dragonet may grow to a size of 7 cm in length. They have thick slime on their skin that inhibits many types of parasitic infection and minimizes the risk of disease following stress or physical trauma. This seems to help protect them from some other more aggressive fish.

Synchiropus picturatus is one of only two animal species known to have blue colouring because of cellular pigment, the other being the closely related Synchiropus splendidus. The name "cyanophore" was proposed for the blue chromatophores, or pigment-containing and light-reflecting cells. In all other known cases, the colour blue comes from thin-film interference from piles of flat, thin and reflecting purine crystals.

References

External links
 
 
 
 Practical Fishkeeping Psychedelic mandarinfish
 

picturesque dragonet
Fish of Southeast Asia
Fish of the Philippines
Fish of Indonesia
Marine fish of Northern Australia
picturesque dragonet
picturesque dragonet